The Sierra de Santa Cruz is a small mountain range in eastern Guatemala. It is situated north of Lake Izabal, in the department of Izabal. The mountain range has a south-west to north-east orientation, and is approximately 55 km long and 13 km wide.
Its highest peaks have an altitude of approximately 1100 m.

Fauna
Frog Craugastor trachydermus is only known from the Sierra de Santa Cruz. It is critically endangered.

See also
Geography of Guatemala

References

Santa Cruz